The 1996 NAIA Division II football season, as part of the 1996 college football season in the United States and the 41st season of college football sponsored by the NAIA, was the 27th (and final) season of play of the NAIA's lower division for football.

The season was played from August to November 1996 and culminated in the 1996 NAIA Division II Football National Championship, played at Jim Carroll Stadium in Savannah, Tennessee.

Sioux Falls defeated Western Washington in the championship game, 47–25, to win their first NAIA national title.

Conference changes

Conference changes
 This is the final season the NAIA officially recognizes a football champion from the Northwest Conference. The NWC, and its six members from Oregon and Washington, would subsequently join the NCAA as a Division III conference.
 The South Dakota Intercollegiate Conference was renamed as the South Dakota-Iowa Intercollegiate Conference after the addition of two football programs from Iowa, Westmar University and Dordt College. This was the first time since the founding of the SDIC in 1917 that it admitted members outside of South Dakota.

Membership changes

Conference standings

Conference champions

Postseason

The 1996 NAIA Division II Football Championship Series concluded on December 21, 1996, with the championship game played at Jim Carroll Stadium in Savannah, Tennessee.  The game was won by the Sioux Falls Cougars over the Western Washington Vikings by a score of 47–25.

Bracket

  * denotes OT.

See also
 1996 NCAA Division I-A football season
 1996 NCAA Division I-AA football season
 1996 NCAA Division II football season
 1996 NCAA Division III football season

References

 
NAIA Football National Championship